Time to Move On may refer to:

Time to Move On (album), 1993 album by Billy Ocean
Time to Move On (song), a 1994 song by Tom Petty